Heavy Rocks may refer to:

 Heavy Rocks (2002 album), by Japanese band Boris
 Heavy Rocks (2011 album), by Japanese band Boris
 Heavy Rocks (2022 album), by Japanese band Boris